Brian Jenkins (born 1 August 1935) is a Welsh former professional footballer. During his career, he made over 100 appearances in the Football League during spells with Cardiff City, Exeter City and Bristol Rovers.

Career
Born in Treherbert, Jenkins played local amateur football for Cwmparc before being spotted by Cardiff City in 1956. After impressing in the club's reserve side, making his professional debut on 9 November 1957 in a 1–1 draw with Ipswich Town. After appearing in fifteen consecutive league matches at the start of the 1958–59 season, Jenkins was called up by Wales as a late replacement for Phil Woosnam for a match against England on 26 November 1958 but did not feature in the match. However, he was displaced in the Cardiff side soon after by Colin Hudson and later Johnny Watkins. In June 1961, Jenkins joined Exeter City along with Derrick Sullivan for a combined fee of £5,000 and made his debut against Mansfield Town two months later.

In his second season at St James Park, he was placed on the transfer list with the club valuing him at £1,500. Several clubs registered interest before Jenkins chose to move to Bristol Rovers in July 1963 with Exeter waiving a potential transfer fee. After making seven league appearances for Rovers, Jenkins moved into non-league football with Merthyr Tydfill. In 1967, he joined King's Lynn, working in a local newsagents alongside his playing commitments. He scored seven goals in his first two matches for the club would go on to score over 100 goals during a four-year spell.

References

1935 births
Living people
Welsh footballers
Cardiff City F.C. players
Exeter City F.C. players
Bristol Rovers F.C. players
Merthyr Tydfil F.C. players
King's Lynn F.C. players
English Football League players
Association football wingers